Hyperaspis signata is a species of lady beetle in the family Coccinellidae. It is found in North America.

Subspecies
These two subspecies belong to the species Hyperaspis signata:
 Hyperaspis signata bicentralis Casey, 1899
 Hyperaspis signata signata (Olivier, 1808)

References

Further reading

 

Coccinellidae
Articles created by Qbugbot
Beetles described in 1808